John Morris  (born 1873) was a Welsh international footballer. He was part of the Wales national football team, playing 1 match on 19 February 1898 against Ireland. At club level, he played for Chirk.

His brothers, Charlie and Robert, were also Wales internationals.

See also
 List of Wales international footballers (alphabetical)
 List of Wales international footballers born outside Wales

References

1873 births
Welsh footballers
Wales international footballers
Chirk AAA F.C. players
Place of birth missing
Year of death missing
Association footballers not categorized by position